Choi Mi-ok (born 13 October 1971) is a former North Korean female alpine skier. She represented North Korea at the 1992 Winter Olympics, competing in the alpine skiing event.

References

External links 

1971 births
Living people
North Korean female alpine skiers
Olympic alpine skiers of North Korea
Alpine skiers at the 1992 Winter Olympics